Herzing University is a private university with its headquarters in Milwaukee, Wisconsin, and several locations throughout the United States. The university offers degrees in professions including nursing, technology, business, and healthcare.

History
Herzing University was founded by Henry and Suzanne Herzing in 1965 as a computer training institute in Milwaukee, Wisconsin.

In 1970, the school was established as Herzing Institute, and the organization started to grow through the acquisition of other schools. The name of the institution had changed again to Herzing College in 1996. Over the course of years, Herzing has grown to include nine ground campuses in the United States, plus an online division. In 2009, with the addition of graduate programs, the institution was renamed to Herzing University.

In 2015, Herzing University became a nonprofit institution.

Currently, Herzing University's corporate headquarters are located in Menomonee Falls, Wisconsin. This is also the current location of the online division.

Academics
Students have the option to attend one of the 9 ground campuses in seven U.S. states or earn their degree fully online. Students can also take some online classes while taking other classes at one of the ground campuses.

Herzing's educational programs include fields of study in nursing, healthcare, technology, business, legal studies and public safety. Degree options available at Herzing University include Certificates, Diplomas, Associate of Science degrees, Bachelor of Science degrees and master's degrees. Degree options vary based upon campus location.

Accreditation
Herzing University is accredited by the Higher Learning Commission and holds specialized accreditation for several nursing programs through the Commission on Collegiate Nursing Education as well as several other programs.

Campuses

College Navigator lists 10 locations:
Akron, Ohio (established in 1970, formerly Akron Institute of Herzing University)
Atlanta, Georgia (founded in 1949 as Massey Business College, became part of Herzing in 1979)
Birmingham, Alabama (founded as Electronic Computer Programming Institute in 1965, Herzing acquired it in 1968)
Brookfield, Wisconsin (2010)
Metairie, Louisiana (1996)
Kenosha, Wisconsin (2009)
Madison, Wisconsin (founded in 1948 as Wisconsin School of Electronics, the school merged with Herzing Institute in 1970)
St. Louis Park, Minnesota (created by the merger of two colleges, Minneapolis Drafting School, established in 1961 and became part of Herzing University in 2000, and Lakeland Medical-Dental Academy, established in 1958, became part of Herzing in 2002)
Toledo, Ohio (2009) closed
Winter Park, Florida (1995)

Student outcomes
According to College Scorecard, Herzing's graduation rate varies from 14 percent (in Akron, Ohio) to 62 percent in Minneapolis. The typical salary after attending is $37,800. Typical student loan debt is $23,140 and the student loan repayment rate is 30 percent.

References

External links
 Official website

Educational institutions established in 1965
Private universities and colleges in Alabama
Private universities and colleges in Florida
Private universities and colleges in Georgia (U.S. state)
Private universities and colleges in Louisiana
Private universities and colleges in Ohio
Private universities and colleges in Minnesota
Private universities and colleges in Nebraska
Private universities and colleges in Wisconsin
Former for-profit universities and colleges in the United States
1965 establishments in Wisconsin